The Singapore women's national ice hockey team is the women's national ice hockey team in Singapore.

History
2014 IIHF Women's Challenge Cup of Asia Division I. Finish: 3rd (7th overall)
2016 IIHF Women's Challenge Cup of Asia Division I. Finish: 3rd (3rd overall)
2017 IIHF Women's Challenge Cup of Asia. Finish: 3rd
2018 IIHF Women's Challenge Cup of Asia. Finish: 4th

2019
In the 2019 IIHF Women's Challenge Cup of Asia, the team finished third behind Thailand and Chinese Taipei. Wasunun Angkulpattanasuk of Thailand finished as the tournaments leading goaltender with a save percentage of 93.62 however the IIHF Directorate named Singapore's Qina Foo as the best goaltender.

All-time record against other nations
Last match update: 18 March 2022

References

Ice hockey in Singapore
Ice hockey
Women's national ice hockey teams in Asia